The discography of American rapper the Game consists of 11 studio albums, six compilation albums, two soundtrack albums, 15 mixtapes, 31 singles (including 15 as a featured artist) and 39 music videos. His music has been released on major record labels Interscope Records, Geffen Records and DGC Records, along with subsidiaries Aftermath Entertainment and G-Unit Records, including independent record labels Get Low Recordz and Fast Life Music, Inc. Records which has released some of his early material.

The Game's major label debut album, The Documentary, was released in January 2005 and it produced five singles, including the two US Billboard Hot 100 top five singles "How We Do" and "Hate It or Love It", with rapper 50 Cent in which both singles reached gold sales status. The other three singles include "Westside Story" with rapper 50 Cent, "Dreams" and "Put You on the Game". The album reached number one in the US, and shipped over 2 million copies and was certified double platinum by the Recording Industry Association of America (RIAA). After the album's release the Game was considered to be a driving force in reviving and bringing back the West Coast hip hop scene, which had been overshadowed by artists from the East and South. The Game was nominated for two 2006 Grammy Awards: Grammy Award for Best Rap Song and Grammy Award for Best Rap Performance by a Duo or Group for the hit single "Hate It or Love It".

After the Game had a falling out from Aftermath Entertainment and G-Unit Records, he retained his deal with Interscope Records while merely swapping roofs with subsidiary, Geffen Records. The Game's second album, Doctor's Advocate, debuted at number one on the US Billboard 200 albums chart making it his second number one album in a row, also making it another commercial success with shipping just under 358,000 sales in its first week. Doctor's Advocate produced three singles "It's Okay (One Blood)" with reggae singer Junior Reid, "Let's Ride" and "Wouldn't Get Far" with rapper Kanye West. The album was set out by the Game to prove that he was still able to make good music and be a successful artist as he did on The Documentary without the help of Dr. Dre or 50 Cent.

The Game's third album, LAX, went head to head with heavy metal and nu metal band Slipknot's All Hope Is Gone on the Billboard 200, as both albums were released on August 26, 2008. LAX ended up debuting at Number two on the Billboard 200, at first it looked like LAX had debuted ahead of All Hope Is Gone by 13 copies, with such a close difference. Initially, Billboard published an article stating that the Game had secured the top spot with a margin of 13 units, in what was described as the "closest race for number one since Nielsen SoundScan began tracking Data in 1991". Slipknot's labels Warner Music Group and Roadrunner Records asked for a soundscan recount, a historic first. Nielsen proceeded to the recount, which placed LAX at number two with 238,382 copies, and Slipknot in first position with 239,516 copies scanned, a margin of 1,134 copies. After the recount 12 hours later, the article was rewritten and Slipknot was awarded the number one spot, having sold 239,516 units. LAX produced four singles "Game's Pain" with R&B singer Keyshia Cole, "Dope Boys" with Blink-182 drummer Travis Barker, "My Life" with rapper Lil Wayne and "Camera Phone" with R&B singer Ne-Yo.

Studio albums

Compilation albums

Soundtrack albums

Mixtapes

Singles

As lead artist

As featured artist

Other charted songs or certified songs

Guest appearances

Production discography

Music videos

Notes

References

External links
 
 
 Game at Discogs

Discographies of American artists
Hip hop discographies